The Children of Noisy Village is a Swedish film which was released to cinemas in Sweden on 6 December 1986, directed by Lasse Hallström, based on the books about The Six Bullerby Children by Astrid Lindgren.

A sequel, More About the Children of Noisy Village, premiered the following year. The two movies were then reworked into a 7 episode TV-series that was broadcast in 1989.

Cast
 Linda Bergström as Lisa
 Crispin Dickson Wendenius as Lasse
 Henrik Larsson as Bosse
 Ellen Demérus as Britta
 Anna Sahlin as Anna
 Harald Lönnbro as Olle
 Tove Edfeldt as Kerstin

Soundtrack 
The instrumental music was composed by Georg Riedel. Astrid Lindgren wrote the lyrics to the songs Now That Night Is Near (Alla ska sova) and Falukorvsvisan. Other songs sung in the film are old Swedish folk or children's songs.

References

External links
 
 
 The Children of Noisy Village at astridlindgren.se 
 
 

1986 films
Swedish children's films
1987 Swedish television series debuts
Films based on works by Astrid Lindgren
Films directed by Lasse Hallström
Swedish children's television series
1980s Swedish television series
1980s Swedish films